133 Squadron RAF was one of the famous Eagle Squadrons formed from American volunteers serving with the Royal Air Force (RAF) during the Second World War.

History
133 Squadron was first formed in 1918 at RAF Ternhill. It was a training unit for the Handley Page O/400, flying the Royal Aircraft Factory F.E.2, that was expected to move to France, but was disbanded on 4 July 1918. Various attempts to reform as both a bomber and fighter squadron were all abandoned as the end of the First World War approached.

It was reformed at RAF Coltishall in July 1941 as the third of the Eagle Squadrons, equipped with Hawker Hurricane IIB fighters. It transferred to RAF Duxford in August, and by October was at RAF Eglinton, County Londonderry in Northern Ireland, where it was equipped with Supermarine Spitfire IIAs. It then transferred back to the south-east England including time at RAF Biggin Hill. The squadron ran fighter sweeps over France until September 1942 when it was transferred to the USAAF and became the 336th Fighter Squadron of the 4th Fighter Group.

On an escort mission to Morlaix on 26 September 1942 the squadron was held up by strong headwinds, leading it to mistake Brest for the British coast. They lost 11 out of 12 of their new Spitfire Mk IXs, four pilots being killed, six captured (one of whom was later murdered by the Germans after taking part in the escape from Stalag Luft III) and one evading. The squadron was transferred to the USAAF three days later, but this was part of a previously planned transfer of all three Eagle Squadrons to US command, and not a reaction to the Morlaix disaster.

1941 Spitfire crash in the Republic of Ireland 
In November 1941, while the squadron was based in Northern Ireland (see above), one of its pilots – Pilot Officer Roland "Bud" Wolfe of Nebraska – crashed in the Republic of Ireland. Because the republic was officially neutral throughout the war, Wolfe was interned.

While he was on patrol near the Inishowen peninsula, the engine of Wolfe's Spitfire suddenly overheated and began to lose power and altitude. As he was unable to land safely, Wolfe decided to abandon his aircraft. After bailing out, he landed in County Donegal. His Spitfire crashed in a heather-covered area of Moneydarragh, Gleneely.

After being arrested, Wolfe was sent to Curragh Camp, where Allied military aviators were interned by the Irish government during the war. Wolfe spent two years in the camp, before he was able to return to active service as a fighter pilot (by which time both he and his squadron had been officially transferred to the United States Army Air Forces).

On 28 June 2011, Wolfe's Spitfire was recovered by a team led by aviation historian Johnny McNee. The recovery was filmed for documentary purposes by the BBC.

Aircraft operated
 1918 - Royal Aircraft Factory FE.2b
 1941 - Hawker Hurricane IIB
 1941 - Supermarine Spitfire IIB
 1942 - Supermarine Spitfire VA and VB
 1942 - Supermarine Spitfire IX

Fiction
In the 2005 episode of Doctor Who "The Empty Child", Jack Harkness, from the 51st century, poses as a volunteer in the squadron during 1941.

References

Notes

Bibliography

 Caine, Philip D. American Pilots in the RAF: The WWII Eagle Squadrons. Brassey's, 1993. .
 Childers, James Saxon. War Eagles: The Story of the Eagle Squadron. Windmill Press, 1943.
Republished by Eagle Publishing in 1983, . Same as the 1943 edition, except it has an epilogue of the members in 1982.
 Halley, James J. The Squadrons of the Royal Air Force & Commonwealth, 1918-1988. Tonbridge, Kent, UK: Air-Britain (Historians) Ltd., 1988. .
 Haughland, Vern. The Eagle Squadrons: Yanks in the RAF, 1940-1942. Ziff-Davis Flying Books, 1979.
Republished by TAB Books in 1992, with all the photos different from the 1st edition.
 Haughland, Vern. The Eagles' War: The Saga of the Eagle Squadron Pilots, 1940-1945. Jason Aronson, Inc., 1982. .
Republished by TAB Books in 1992, with all the photos different from the 1st edition.
 Holmes, Tony. American Eagles: American Volunteers in the R.A.F., 1937-1943. Classic Publications, 2001. .
 Jefford, C.G. RAF Squadrons, A Comprehensive Record of the Movement and Equipment of all RAF Squadrons and their Antecedents since 1912. Shrewsbury, UK: Airlife Publishing, 1998 (Second edition 2001). .
 Rawlings, John D.R. Fighter Squadrons of the RAF and their Aircraft. London: Macdonald and Jane's (Publishers) Ltd., 1969 (new edition 1976, reprinted 1978). .

External links
 133 Squadron history
 RAF Eagle Squadron (historic video)
4th Fighter Group WWII Official WWII Association Website

Royal Air Force aircraft squadrons
Royal Flying Corps squadrons
Military units and formations established in 1918
1918 establishments in the United Kingdom
Eagle Squadrons